The 2007 United States Grand Prix (formally the 2007 Formula 1 United States Grand Prix) was a Formula One motor race held at the Indianapolis Motor Speedway in Speedway, Indiana, in the United States on 17 June 2007. The 73-lap race was the seventh race of the 2007 FIA Formula One World Championship and was won by McLaren-Mercedes driver Lewis Hamilton. His teammate, Fernando Alonso, finished the race in second position whilst Ferrari driver, Felipe Massa, completed the podium by finishing third. This was the debut race of the future four time world champion Sebastian Vettel with BMW Sauber F1 Team.

The race was Formula One's final visit to Indianapolis, after an eight-year period. The event was removed from the 2008 calendar a few months later and Formula One did not return to the United States until November 2012, at the Circuit of the Americas.

Report

Background

Robert Kubica's big crash at the Canadian Grand Prix resulted in the season's first driver change. Although Kubica passed the medical examination and did not seem to show any ill effects, the FIA medical delegate decided it would be best to rest him for the weekend, and not risk another concussion so close to the previous one. He was replaced in the BMW Sauber team by Formula Renault 3.5 Series championship leader, 19-year-old German Sebastian Vettel, who made his Formula One debut at the Indianapolis circuit.

Practice
Friday's morning practice was dominated by McLaren and BMW Sauber, with Fernando Alonso putting in the fastest time.  Sebastian Vettel started his first race weekend with a fourth fastest time. Ferrari, who expected that their pace would return at Indianapolis, found themselves on either side of Williams driver Nico Rosberg with the fifth and seventh fastest times.

Qualifying
David Coulthard and his Red Bull-Renault were the first to leave the pit lane in part one of the qualifying session. His partner, Mark Webber, was close behind followed by the Spyker and Williams cars. Later in the session, with about six minutes left, Coulthard spun out in turn eight. Fernando Alonso ran first, Nick Heidfeld second, and Lewis Hamilton closely behind in third. Although they struggled, both Ferraris made it, as well as Vettel. Scott Speed failed to make it out of Q1 in his native country, along with team-mate Vitantonio Liuzzi. Adrian Sutil, Takuma Sato, Alexander Wurz, and Christijan Albers also missed the cut.

McLaren and Ferrari began part two of their battle with Hamilton taking the top spot early. However, his team-mate, Fernando Alonso took top spot midway through. Felipe Massa, Kimi Räikkönen, and Heidfeld along with the two McLarens made the top five again. Webber made it to the next session, although his team-mate Coulthard was relegated along with 2002 United States Grand Prix winner Rubens Barrichello. Barrichello's partner Jenson Button was also relegated, along with Nico Rosberg, Anthony Davidson, and Ralf Schumacher.

In part three Hamilton was first out and set the quickest time with a 1:13:089. Alonso was about four tenths behind, followed by Heidfeld and the Ferraris. Giancarlo Fisichella and Heikki Kovalainen, both Renault drivers, also were near the top, but Jarno Trulli and Webber knocked Fisichella down. With about 5 minutes left, Massa took first spot and Räikkönen took second. Hamilton was bumped to third, Alonso fourth, and Heidfeld remained fifth. About one minute later, Hamilton took the top spot, and Alonso second. Alonso had one lap left,  but could only get within about 2 tenths of a second of rookie teammate Lewis Hamilton. Massa and Räikkönen were dropped to third and fourth respectively. Heidfeld held on to fifth, with Kovalainen in sixth, bouncing back from his disappointing 22nd starting position in Canada. Vettel finished seventh, just two spots behind his temporary partner, Heidfeld. Trulli was 8th, with Red Bull-Renault's Mark Webber ninth and Fisichella tenth.

Race

Lewis Hamilton, on the pole, sped off the grid. Fernando Alonso stayed close behind, followed by the Ferraris. The drama in turn one was in the middle of the pack. Vettel ran wide and lost places, but escaped damage. Ralf Schumacher, who started in 12th, turned in late, and ended up crashing into David Coulthard, who he had started alongside. Jenson Button and Nico Rosberg, 13th and 14th respectively, escaped but Rubens Barrichello got caught up. Schumacher was out on the spot, while Coulthard and Barrichello limped back to the pits and retired.

Also, Kimi Räikkönen was caught by Nick Heidfeld and Heikki Kovalainen. Up front, the top four were running strongly until the pit stops came around. The top four all went in early, soon followed by Heidfeld in the BMW Sauber, leaving sixth place qualifier Kovalainen in first. He led five laps, and Hamilton then regained the lead (Alonso and Massa led one lap each).

Despite a mid-race challenge from team-mate Fernando Alonso, in which the two McLaren drivers were racing side-by-side for the lead down the main straight, Hamilton maintained the lead to win his second-ever Formula One Grand Prix race, the other victory being in the previous event at Montreal. This marked McLaren's first 1-2 finish at the circuit and their first win at Indianapolis since Mika Häkkinen's final Grand Prix win in 2001.

Takuma Sato spun off at turn 3 after managing to pass Adrian Sutil. Sato had been due a drive-through penalty for overtaking under yellow flags, but this was changed to a 10-place grid penalty for the next race.

There were also three mechanical retirements – Nico Rosberg in the Williams suffered an engine failure with only five laps to go, while BMW Sauber's Nick Heidfeld and Toro Rosso's Vitantonio Liuzzi also retired from the race due to mechanical failure.

Classification

Qualifying

Race

Championship standings after the race 

Drivers' Championship standings

Constructors' Championship standings

Note: Only the top five positions are included for both sets of standings.

References

External links

 Official website
 Official Formula1.com page
 Detailed United States Grand Prix results

United States Grand Prix
2007
United States Grand Prix, 2007
Grand Prix
2007 in sports in Indiana
Grand Prix